Cesare Cattaneo Della Volta (Genoa, 1680 - Genoa, 22 July 1756) was the 159th Doge of the Republic of Genoa.

Biography 
Officially crowned on August 31, his mandate as Doge was marked by the end of hostilities and the signing of the Treaty of Aix-la-Chapelle, in 1748, that brought a new air of hope and tranquility for the neo doge, and for the Genoese, after the clashes and riots of the people. Reabsorbed the territories of Finale and the colony of  Corsica, the doge Cesare Cattaneo Della Volta actively worked for the return of the normalization of those political-social relations that the anti-oligarchic jolts that emerged during the revolt itself had threatened to crack. Ceased office as doge on March 6, 1750 he did not retire to private life, but rather continued to serve the state machine even in the post-customs period. The former doge died on 22 July 1756 leaving his only heirs the nephews Giovan Battista and Giacomo Cattaneo Della Volta, sons of the already deceased brother, and former doge Nicolò.

See also 

 Republic of Genoa
 Doge of Genoa

Sources 

 Buonadonna, Sergio. Rosso doge. I dogi della Repubblica di Genova dal 1339 al 1797.

18th-century Doges of Genoa
1680 births
1756 deaths